Rogério Dutra Silva and André Sá were the defending champions, but chose not to participate together. Sá teamed up with Thomaz Bellucci, but lost to Federico Delbonis and Máximo González in the quarterfinals. Dutra Silva played alongside Roman Jebavý, but lost to Delbonis and González in the semifinals.

Delbonis and González went on to win the title, defeating Wesley Koolhof and Artem Sitak in the final, 6–4, 6–2.

Seeds

Draw

Draw

References
 Main draw

2018 Brasil Open